Sterculia monosperma, also known as Chinese chestnut, Thai chestnut, seven sisters' fruit, and phoenix eye fruit, is a deciduous tropical nut-bearing tree of genus Sterculia.

Distribution 
Its origin is Southern China (Guangdong, Guangxi and Yunnan) and Taiwan, but it is now a common cultivated tree in Northern Thailand, Northern Vietnam, mountainous areas of Malaysia and Indonesia, as well as Northern Laos and Shan State in Burma.

Human uses 
The ripe nuts are edible. They may be eaten plain, roasted, boiled with water and salt or also may be used to prepare dishes, such as sauteed with chicken.

In China these nuts are one of the traditional foods of the Qixi Festival, the 'night of the seven', also known as the 'anniversary of the seventh sister' (七姐誕). Qixi is celebrated on the seventh day of the seventh lunar month which falls on 20 Aug 2015 and on 9 Aug 2016 next year.

The pods containing the nuts have a striking red color when ripe and the nuts are much darker —their husk or pericarpus is almost black— and smaller than the common chestnuts of genus Castanea. The pellicle is brown and smooth and the fruit is yellowish in color.

Gallery

References 

monosperma
Trees of China
Trees of Thailand
Flora of Myanmar
Flora of Laos